The women's 100 metres hurdles event at the 1994 Commonwealth Games was held at the Centennial Stadium in Victoria, British Columbia.

Medalists

Results

Heats

Wind:Heat 1: +1.0 m/s, Heat 2: +2.1 m/s

Final
Wind: -2.0 m/s

References

100
1994
1994 in women's athletics